Le Vigilant is a  strategic nuclear submarine in service with the French Navy.

See also 

List of submarines of France
 HMS Vigilant (S30) - British Vanguard-class ballistic missile submarine, commissioned in 1996

References 

Triomphant-class submarines
Ships built in France
2003 ships
Submarines of France